An alligator is a large reptile in the Crocodilia order.

Alligator may also refer to:

Music

Albums
Alligator (Abandon Kansas album), 2015
Alligator (Leslie West album), 1989
Alligator (The National album), 2005
Alligator, by Brad Gillis, 2000

Songs
"Alligator" (Tegan and Sara song), 2009
"Alligator" (Of Monsters and Men song), 2019
"Alligator", by the Grateful Dead from Anthem of the Sun, 1968
"Alligator", by Paul McCartney from New, 2013

Other uses in music
Alligator Records, a record label
DJ Aligator (Ali Movasat), Iranian-Danish trance producer and DJ
The Alligator, a fad dance mentioned in the 1962 song "Land of a Thousand Dances"

Transport

Maritime
HMS Alligator, various Royal Navy vessels
USS Alligator, various US Navy vessels
Alligator (1793 ship), a British East Indiaman and general trader
Alligator (steamboat), operated in Florida 1888–1909
Alligator boat, an amphibious tugboat, used in North American forest industry
Alligator class landing ship, a Type 1171 landing ship used by Russian and Ukrainian Navies
Landing Vehicle Tracked or "alligator", an amphibious warfare vehicle

Other
Aligator 4x4, a military armored car developed by the Slovak Republic in the 1990s
Alligator Rainwear, British company 
Alligator (motorcycle), a motorcycle built by Dan Gurney's All American Racers
ALCO RSD-15, an American diesel-electric locomotive built from 1956 to 1960	
Kamov Ka-52, nicknamed the Alligator, a Russian helicopter
 Snipex Alligator, a Ukrainian anti-material rifle

Other uses 
Alligator (book), a parody of Ian Fleming's James Bond novels
Alligator (film), a 1980 horror film
Alligator, Mississippi, a town in the US
Alligator clip or crocodile clip, an electrical connector
The Independent Florida Alligator, a student newspaper of the University of Florida
Alligator shirt, a shirt made by Lacoste, referring to the brand's mascot
"Alligator" or Halpatter Tustenuggee, Seminole leader who witnessed the Dade Massacre in the Second Seminole War

See also
Alligator Alley (disambiguation)
Crocodile, Another large reptile in the order Crocodilia that is often confused with the Alligator